Mojtaba Zarei (born February 20, 1983) is a retired Iranian footballer who last played for Peykan and Perspolis among other clubs in Persian Gulf Pro League.

Club career
After playing for Moghavemat for 3 seasons and playing for Rah Ahan for one season, at the end of the 2008/09 season he moved to Persepolis on a two-year deal.

Club career statistics
Last Update: 20 January 2012 

 Assist Goals

International career
He started his international career in August 2009 under Afshin Ghotbi against Bahrain.

Honours

Club
Hazfi Cup
Winner: 2
2009/10 with Persepolis
2010/11 with Persepolis
Runner Up:1
2008/09 with Rah Ahan

References

 Gahar Zagros vs. Perspolis Retrieved int.soccerway.com 30 July 2012
 Rah Ahan vs. Pas Hamedan Retrieved int.soccerway.com 30 July 2009
 Perspolis vs. Tractor Retrieved int.soccerway.com 26 October 2009
Biography Mojtaba Zarei Retrieved (in Persian).
مجتبي زارعي به پرسپوليس پيوست حقيقي دو فصل ديگر تمديد کرد www.isna.ir Retrieved (in Persian).
پرسپولیس با شکست تراکتورسازی مدعی شد www.bbc.com 26 October 2009
مجتبی زارع به تیم فوتبال پاس همدان پیوست www.mehrnews.com Retrieved (in Persian).

External links

Mojtaba Zarei at PersianLeague.com
Mojtaba Zarei at Soccerway
Mojtaba Zarei at FootballDatabase.eu
Mojtaba Zarei at playmakerstats.com

Living people
Rah Ahan players
Fajr Sepasi players
F.C. Aboomoslem players
Iranian footballers
1984 births
Persepolis F.C. players
Naft Tehran F.C. players
Paykan F.C. players
Association football forwards